Massimo De Martin (born January 3, 1983 in Belluno) is an Italian professional football player who is currently unattached.

He played in the Serie B for Vicenza Calcio.

External links
 

1983 births
Living people
Italian footballers
Serie B players
A.C. Prato players
L.R. Vicenza players
F.C. Pavia players
Virtus Bergamo Alzano Seriate 1909 players
A.S.D. Sangiovannese 1927 players
Association football forwards